OGLE-TR-56 is a dim, distant, magnitude 17 Sun-like star located approximately  away in the constellation of Sagittarius.
This star is listed as an eclipsing type variable star with the eclipse due to the passage of the planet as noted in the discovery papers.

Planetary system 
In 2002, a possible planet was discovered transiting the star, and after additional observations to rule out false positives, it was confirmed. At the time of discovery it was the shortest-period planet.

See also 
 Lists of exoplanets

References

External links 
 

Planetary systems with one confirmed planet
Planetary transit variables
Sagittarius (constellation)
G-type stars
Sagittarii, V5157